The White Line is a 2019 Namibian drama romantic history film directed by Desiree Kahikopo-Meiffret and co-produced by director herself along with Fetteroff Colen, Girley Jazamam, Prudence Kolong and Micheal Pulse. The film stars Girley Jazama and Jan-Baren Scheepers in lead roles whereas Sunet Van Wyk, Muhindua Kaura and Mervin Uahupirapi made supportive roles. The film revolves around a love affair between a Black maid and a White Afrikaner Police officer in 1963 after the Old Location uprising.

The film has been shot in Karibib, Usakos and Okahandja in central Namibia. It had its first festival  premiere at the 2019 Durban International Film Festival. The film received critics positive acclaim and screened worldwide. In 2019 at the Namibian Theatre and Film Awards, lead actress Girley Jazama was nominated for the Best Female Actor award. In 2020, the film was nominated for the five awards: Best Actress in a Leading Role, Best First feature by a Director, Best Achievement in Costume Design, Best Screenplay and Best Film in an African Language at the African Movie Academy Awards. In the same year, the film won the Kilimandjaro Award for the Best Film at the Festival Africlap.

Cast
 Girley Jazama as Sylvia Kamutjemo
 Jan-Baren Scheepers as Pieter de Wit
 Sunet Van Wyk as Anna-Marie van der Merwe
 Muhindua Kaura as Godfried Snr Kamutjemo
 Mervin Uahupirapi as Unotjari Kamutjemo
 Charl Botha as Jan van der Merwe
 Joalette de Villiers as Sunet de Kock
 Vanessa Kamatoto as Jacobine Kamutjemo
 Desmond Katamila as Godfried Jnr Kamutjemo
 Hazel Hinda as Older Sylvia

References

External links 
 

Namibian drama films
2019 films
2019 drama films